The Child of Lov is the only studio album by Belgian artist The Child of Lov. It was released on 6 May 2013 through Double Six.

Critical reception
Upon release the album was met with generally positive reviews from music critics. At Metacritic the album received an average score of 74, based on 12 reviews, indicating "Generally favourable reviews".

Track listing

Sample credits
 "One Day" contains a sample of "Una Stanza Vuota" by Calibro 35.

References

2013 debut albums
Double Six Records albums